Songs and Saddles is a 1938 American Western film directed by Harry L. Fraser.

Plot

Cast 
Gene Austin as Gene Austin
Lynne Berkeley as Carol Turner
Henry Roquemore as Lawyer Jed Hill
Walter Wills as Pop Turner
Ted Claire as Mark Bower
Joan Brooks as Lucy
Karl Hackett as Banker George Morrow
Charles King as Road boss Falcon
John Merton as Henchman Rocky Renaut
Candy Hall as Musician Slim
Coco Heimel as Musician Porky
John Elliott as Sheriff John Lawton
Ben Corbett as Henchman Sparks
Bob Terry as Henchman Klinker
Lloyd Ingraham as Judge Harrison

Soundtrack 
Gene Austin with Candy Hall and Coco Heimel - "Song of the Saddle" (Written by Gene Austin)
Gene Austin - "I'm Comin' Home" (Written by Gene Austin)
Gene Austin with Candy Hall and Coco Heimel - "I Fell Down and Broke My Heart" (Written by Gene Austin)
Gene Austin - "Why Can't I Be Your Sweetheart Tonight?" (Written by Gene Austin)
Gene Austin - "The Man From Texas" (Written by Gene Austin)

External links 

1938 films
1930s Western (genre) musical films
American black-and-white films
Grand National Films films
American Western (genre) musical films
Films with screenplays by Harry L. Fraser
1930s English-language films
1930s American films